He Jiong (born 28 April 1974) is a Chinese television host, singer, actor, director and a former Arabic lecturer in Beijing Foreign Studies University.

Early life and education 
He Jiong was born on 28 April 1974 in Yuhua District, Changsha, Hunan, China. His father, He Wei, who was a professor of philosophy, ran a seafood restaurant chain. His elder brother He Hao is a military personnel. In 1986, He enrolled in the High School Attached to Hunan Normal University.

In September 1992, he was admitted to study Arabic at Beijing Foreign Studies University. After graduating in July 1997, he became a lecturer of Arabic at his alma mater, during which time he used an Arabic name "Anwar". After the university and He agreed to adjust the content of his work in 2007, in order for him to focus on his hosting career, He resigned from the position in January 2015.

Career 
In 1995, He hosted the show Big Pinwheel on CCTV-14, together with fellow host Liu Chunyan. In 1998, after receiving recognition for his work on the CCTV, He, along with Li Xiang, began hosting the variety show Happy Camp, in what would become one of the most successful shows produced by the Hunan Broadcasting System, and one of the most popular shows in Chinese television history.

For the next few years, He established himself as one of the most prominent hosts in Mainland China, simultaneously hosting variety shows, music shows, cooking contests, and New Years Galas for Hunan, Beijing, and CCTV. In 2004, He debuted as a singer with the album Keyi Ai (Chinese: 可以爱), featuring Gardenia in Blossom as the main single. In 2005, He starred as the main character in the historical drama Emperor Zheng De. In 2006, He was cast for the Stan Lai stage play Secret Love for the Peach Blossom Spring.  The same year, the introduction of Du Haitao and Wu Xin into mainstream media led to the establishment of the Happy Family, consisting of He, Xie Na, Li Weijia, Du, and Wu.

In 2007, He hosted the Chinese singing competition Super Boy, a spin-off of the show Super Girl, a competition that encouraged millions of Chinese netizens to democratically vote for progression in the show. The following year, He hosted the first three episodes of the talk show Day Day Up, taking over for fellow host Wang Han. In 2009, He, along with Wang, hosted the second season of Super Girl.

In 2013, He, together with the Happy Family, starred in the comedy film Bring Happiness Home. Since 2015, He has hosted the cooking show Go Fridge, a spin-off of Please Take Care of My Refrigerator, with Jackson Wang of Got7. The same year, He made his film director debut with the teen romance Forever Young, a film based on his debut single Gardenia in Blossom. In March 2016, He featured as a permanent cast on the variety program Who's the Murderer. Since 2017, together with Henry Lau and Huang Lei, He has been a cast member for the reality show Back to Field, a show that featured the simplistic lifestyles away from city centers. In 2019, He began hosting the reality show An Exciting Offer.

In 2020, He ranked 53rd on Forbes China Celebrity 100 list.

In 2022, following the unexpected closure of the show Happy Camp, which marked the end of its 24-year run, He began hosting Hello, Saturday as its replacement program.

He Jiong currently holds the Guinness World Record as the most-followed male celebrity on the Chinese social media platform Weibo, with over 115 million followers, as of February 2023.

Filmography

Television hosting

Ongoing
 Happy Camp in Hunan Channel from  March 1998

2013
I Am a Singer in Hunan Channel

2015
UP IDOL
为她而战
Go Fridge Season 1 with Jackson Wang (Got7)
Happy Camp in Hunan Channel (From March 1998 until now)
Season 2 of Are you normal with Ella Chen (S.H.E)

2016
 Who's the Murderer Season 1
 Fresh Sunday MC with Jackson Wang (Got7)
 Go Fridge Season 2 MC with Jackson Wang (Got7)
 Are you normal Season 3 with Henry Lau (Super Junior M)
 MC show Happy Camp in Hunan Channel (From March 1998 until now)

2017
 Back to Field Season 1
 Go Fridge Season 3 MC with Jackson Wang (Got7)
 Who's the Murderer Season 2
 Who's the Murderer Season 3
 MC show Happy Camp in Hunan Channel (From March 1998 until now)

2018 
 Back to Field Season 2
 Go Fridge Season 4 MC with Jackson Wang (Got7)
 Who's the Murderer Season 4
 Who's the Keyman
 MC show Happy Camp in Hunan Channel (From March 1998 until now)

2019 
 I Actor
 Go Fridge Season 5
 Back to Field Season 3
 The Miracle Chinese Language
 Who's the Murderer Season 5

2020 
 Go Fridge Season 6
 Back to Field Season 4
 Welcome Back to Sound
 Who's the Murderer Season 6

Films
Source:

Television series
2004, Zhengde Emperor
2005, Do Not Love Me
2006, Never Make A Woman in Tears
2008, Ugly Wudi (guest performer)
2009, Beauties Best (guest performer)
2009, Take My Breath Away (guest performer)
2016, Shuttle Love Millenium (guest performer)
2017, Midnight Diner (guest performer)
2019, Reset Life (guest performer)

Theatre
2003 I Will Make Whatever You like
2006 The Peach Blossom Land
2014 21克拉
2016 Writing in Water

Bibliography
1998, 9: This Is How I Grow Up (炅炅有神——我是这样长大的)
2000, 10: Happy Like Me (快乐如何)
2001, 10: Just Ok (刚刚好)
2005, 4: Wonderful Happiness (最好的幸福)
2015: 来得及

Discography

Albums
1st Studio Be worth loving
Released: 19 April 2004
Label: Hao Music

2nd Studio Wander around 
Released: 23 June 2005
Label: Hao Music

3rd Studio Myself
Released: 5 December 2006
Label: Hao Music

4th Studio Happy family
Released: 21 September 2010
Label: EE-Media

5th Studio Good times
Released: 24 September 2010
Label: EE-Media

MV Music Works
Source:
2010 Love Story 我们约会吧 (He Jiong / Huang Yunling)
2010 Snowflake雪花 (He Jiong / Li Sheng)

References

Chinese television presenters
CCTV television presenters
Chinese children's television presenters
Chinese male film actors
Chinese male television actors
Chinese male voice actors
Male actors from Changsha
Living people
1974 births
Musicians from Changsha
Singers from Hunan
Educators from Hunan
Beijing Foreign Studies University alumni
21st-century Chinese male singers